The 1996 Miller 500 was the 17th stock car race of the 1996 NASCAR Winston Cup Series and the 24th iteration of the event. The race was held on Sunday, July 21, 1996, in Long Pond, Pennsylvania, at Pocono Raceway, a 2.5 miles (4.0 km) triangular permanent course. The race took the scheduled 200 laps to complete. In the final laps of the race, Penske Racing South driver Rusty Wallace would manage to pull away from the field on the final restart with 14 to go to take his 45th career NASCAR Winston Cup Series victory and his fifth victory of the season. To fill out the top three, Rudd Performance Motorsports driver Ricky Rudd and Robert Yates Racing driver Dale Jarrett would finish second and third, respectively.

Background 

The race was held at Pocono Raceway, which is a three-turn superspeedway located in Long Pond, Pennsylvania. The track hosts two annual NASCAR Sprint Cup Series races, as well as one Xfinity Series and Camping World Truck Series event. Until 2019, the track also hosted an IndyCar Series race.

Pocono Raceway is one of a very few NASCAR tracks not owned by either Speedway Motorsports, Inc. or International Speedway Corporation. It is operated by the Igdalsky siblings Brandon, Nicholas, and sister Ashley, and cousins Joseph IV and Chase Mattioli, all of whom are third-generation members of the family-owned Mattco Inc, started by Joseph II and Rose Mattioli.

Outside of the NASCAR races, the track is used throughout the year by Sports Car Club of America (SCCA) and motorcycle clubs as well as racing schools and an IndyCar race. The triangular oval also has three separate infield sections of racetrack – North Course, East Course and South Course. Each of these infield sections use a separate portion of the tri-oval to complete the track. During regular non-race weekends, multiple clubs can use the track by running on different infield sections. Also some of the infield sections can be run in either direction, or multiple infield sections can be put together – such as running the North Course and the South Course and using the tri-oval to connect the two.

Entry list 

 (R) denotes rookie driver.

Qualifying 
Qualifying was originally scheduled to be split into two rounds. The first round was scheduled to be held on Friday, July 19, at 3:00 PM EST. However, only six drivers were able to set a lap before qualifying was rained out and postponed until Friday, July 20, at 9:00 AM EST. Qualifying was eventually combined into only one round. Each driver would have one lap to set a time. For this specific race, positions 26-38 would be decided on time, and depending on who needed it, a select amount of positions were given to cars who had not otherwise qualified but were high enough in owner's points.

No drivers would fail to qualify.

Full qualifying results

Race results

References 

1996 NASCAR Winston Cup Series
NASCAR races at Pocono Raceway
July 1996 sports events in the United States
1996 in sports in Pennsylvania